Liver is a live album by Steve Taylor, released in 1995. Its contents cover all of Taylor's career at the time (up through Squint), including his time with Chagall Guevara.

Track listing
 "Jim Morrison's Grave"
 "The Lament of Desmond R.G. Underwood- Frederick IV"
 "I Want to Be a Clone"
 "Escher's World"
 "On the Fritz"
 "Bannerman"
 "Hero"
 "Jesus Is for Losers"
 "The Finish Line"
 "Violent Blue"

Personnel
 Steve Taylor – vocals
 Wade Jaynes – bass guitar
 Chris Kearny – drums
 Mark Townsend – guitar vocals 
 Greg Wollan – guitar, vocals
source:

References

Steve Taylor albums
Liver